Itasca High School is a 2A public high school located in Itasca, Texas (USA). It is part of the Itasca Independent School District located in north central Hill County. In 2013, the school was rated "Academically Acceptable" by the Texas Education Agency.
>

Unique Nickname
According to local legend in Itasca, a student from the late 1920s helped them come up with one of the state's most unusual nicknames: Wampus Cats.  The imaginary mascot has made Itasca recognizable to people who don't even know the town of 1,500 is 45 miles south of Fort Worth.  ESPN has done a story on it, as has The New York Times.  A Dallas radio station has called it the "quintessential Texas high school football nickname.

Nancy Bowman, a lifelong Itascan who runs the school's special services, explains that the team was having trouble finding a nickname until the perfect one erupted from a post-game locker room celebration.

"Wow, we were really Wampus Cats tonight! shouted Trav Burks, the story goes.

Athletics
The Itasca Wampus Cats compete in the following sports:

Baseball
Basketball
Cross Country
Football
Softball
Track and Field

References

External links
Itasca ISD

Schools in Hill County, Texas
Public high schools in Texas